The final of the Women's hammer throw event at the 2002 European Championships in Munich, Germany was held on August 9, 2002. There were a total number of 44 participating athletes. The qualifying rounds were staged two days earlier, on August 7, with the mark set at 66.00 metres.

On 8 March 2013, the IAAF announced that following retesting of samples taken at the championships, it had been found that Olga Kuzenkova of Russia had taken a banned substance. It was not announced whether this would mean an alteration in the medal result.

Medalists

Abbreviations
All results shown are in metres

Records

Qualification

Group A

Group B

Final

See also
 2000 Women's Olympic Hammer Throw (Sydney)
 2001 Women's World Championships Hammer Throw (Edmonton)
 2002 Hammer Throw Year Ranking
 2003 Women's World Championships Hammer Throw (Paris)
 2004 Women's Olympic Hammer Throw (Athens)

References

 Results
 todor66
 athletix
 hammerthrow.wz

Hammer throw
Hammer throw at the European Athletics Championships
2002 in women's athletics